The 5th Canadian Comedy Awards, presented by the Canadian Comedy Foundation for Excellence (CCFE), honoured the best live, television, and film comedy of 2003. The ceremony was held in 2004 in London, Ontario, concluding the Canadian Comedy Awards Festival.  The ceremony was hosted by Scott Thompson.

Canadian Comedy Awards, also known as Beavers, were awarded in 19 categories. Winners were picked by members of ACTRA (Alliance of Canadian Cinema, Television and Radio Artists), the Canadian Actors' Equity Association, the Writers Guild of Canada, the Directors Guild of Canada, and the Comedy Association.

TV series Corner Gas led with seven nominations followed by the films Mambo Italiano and Expecting with six apiece.  Corner Gas won three Beavers, followed by Expecting and A Mighty Wind with two each. This ceremony also introduced the Chairman's Award which recognized the contributions of Mark Breslin, founder of Yuk Yuk's comedy clubs.

Winners and nominees
Winners are listed first and highlighted in boldface:

Live

Television

Film

Special Awards

Multiple wins
The following people, shows, films, etc. received multiple awards

Multiple nominations
The following people, shows, films, etc. received multiple nominations

References

External links
Canadian Comedy Awards official website

Canadian Comedy Awards
Canadian Comedy Awards
Awards
Awards